Dionísia Pio (born 10 February 1977) is an Angolan handball player.

She competed at the 2004 Summer Olympics, where Angola placed 9th.

References

External links
 

1977 births
Living people
Angolan expatriate sportspeople in Spain
Angolan female handball players
Olympic handball players of Angola
Handball players at the 2004 Summer Olympics